Zionists in Interwar Czechoslovakia: Minority Nationalism and the Politics of Belonging (2016) is a book by Tatjana Lichtenstein published by Indiana University Press. It discusses the rise of Zionism among Jews living in the First Czechoslovak Republic. Lichtenstein also challenges the Czechoslovak myth of exceptionalism by chronicling the constant accusations faced by Jews that they lacked national patriotism towards Czechoslovakia. The book received positive reviews.

References

Further reading

2016 non-fiction books
Antisemitism in Europe
Books about Zionism
History books about Czechoslovakia
History of Zionism
Indiana University Press books
Jewish Czech history
Jewish Slovak history
Zionism in Europe